Andrew Brayshaw (born 8 November 1999) is a professional Australian rules footballer playing for the Fremantle Football Club in the Australian Football League (AFL).

Early career
After an impressive junior career for his school, Haileybury, TAC Cup side Sandringham Dragons and the Victorian Metropolitan representative side, he was recruited by Fremantle with the second overall selection in the 2017 AFL draft.

AFL career
He made his AFL debut for Fremantle in the opening round of the 2018 AFL season after a series of impressive pre-season games. His debut season was cut short when, in Round 20, he was struck by West Coast Eagles player Andrew Gaff in an off-the-ball incident. Gaff was subsequently suspended for eight AFL matches, while Brayshaw suffered a fractured jaw and three dislodged teeth.

Brayshaw played every game in 2020, averaging 20 disposals per game. Brayshaw signed a four year contract extension at the end of the season tying him to Fremantle until 2025.

In Round 21, 2021 he was found guilty of making unreasonable eye contact to Jarrod Berry of the Brisbane Lions and was given a one game suspension. Brayshaw challenged the ban at the AFL tribunal but was unsuccessful in getting it downgraded.

The 2022 AFL season saw Brayshaw earn his first All Australian selection, named on the interchange bench of the 2022 All Australian team.

Personal life
Brayshaw's older brother Angus also plays in the AFL for the Melbourne Demons and his other older brother Hamish previously played for the West Coast Eagles. His father, Mark Brayshaw, played for North Melbourne, his uncle, James, is a radio and television broadcaster and former cricketer and his grandfather Ian Brayshaw is a former State cricketer.

Statistics
Updated to the end of Semi Final 2022.

|-
| 2018
|
| 8 || 17 || 5 || 5 || 127 || 144 || 271 || 49 || 75 || 0.3 || 0.3 || 7.5 || 8.5 || 15.9 || 2.9 || 4.4 || 0
|-
| 2019
|
| 8 || 22 || 7 || 7 || 167 || 205 || 372 || 46 || 113 || 0.3 || 0.3 || 7.6 || 9.3 || 16.9 || 2.1 || 5.1 || 1
|-
| 2020
|
| 8 || 17 || 0 || 3 || 147 || 191 || 338 || 49 || 83 || 0.0 || 0.2 || 8.6 || 11.2 || 19.9 || 2.9 || 4.9 || 9
|-
| 2021
|
| 8 || 20 || 8 || 5 || 265 || 303 || 568 || 101 || 93 || 0.4 || 0.3 || 13.3 || 15.2 || 28.4 || 5.1 || 4.7 || 10
|-
| 2022
|
| 8 || 24 || 12 || 12 || 354 || 350 || 704 || 112 || 149 || 0.5 || 0.5 || 14.7 || 14.5 || 29.3 || 4.6 || 6.2 || 25
|- class="sortbottom"
! colspan=3| Career
! 100
! 32
! 32
! 1061
! 1193
! 2254
! 356
! 513
! 0.3
! 0.3
! 10.6
! 11.9
! 22.5
! 3.5
! 5.1
! 45
|}

Notes

Honours and achievements
Individual
 Leigh Matthews Trophy: 2022
 All-Australian team: 2022
 3× 22under22 team: 2020, 2021, 2022 (c)
 Geoff Christian Medal: 2021

References

External links

1999 births
Living people
Australian rules footballers from Victoria (Australia)
Sandringham Dragons players
People educated at Haileybury (Melbourne)
Fremantle Football Club players
Leigh Matthews Trophy winners